Chloe Hosking (born 1 October 1990) is an Australian professional racing cyclist, who currently rides for UCI Women's WorldTeam . Hosking has represented Australia at junior and then senior levels since 2007. Following success in a number of international events she turned professional in 2010. She competed at the 2012 Summer Olympics in the Women's road race, and won the women's road race at the 2018 Commonwealth Games.

Personal life

Childhood and early life
Hosking was born in Bendigo, Victoria, and moved to the suburb of Campbell in the Australian Capital Territory. As a child she played field hockey and did rock climbing at a national level, however following an injury she asked her father, a keen cyclist, to help get her into cycling. She began cycling competitively in 2002 at the age of twelve, and first represented Australia in 2007 at the age of seventeen.

Hosking started as a track cyclist, but changed her focus to road racing events in 2007. She now specialises in road cycling events, being a strong sprinter and a capable climber.

Outside of cycling Hosking is a student, having completed a Bachelor of Communications degree at Griffith University specialising in journalism. Hosking is currently studying a Professional Doctorate in Law, to graduate as a Juris Doctor.

Family
Hosking is married to Jack Lindsay, whom she met while in primary school in Canberra. Lindsay, an experienced executive and entrepreneur resigned from his position of General Manager at a technology company and moved to Europe in 2021 to return to semi-professional field hockey. The couple were married at Parlour in Canberra near the Nishi building on 7 February 2018, surrounded by a small group of close friends and family

Cycling career

2004-2009: Early years
Hosking competed in her first national cycling events in 2004, and began representing Australia in international events in 2007. As a junior Hosking competed for the Canberra Cycling Club, mainly riding in track cycling events and achieving considerable success, including winning the Women's Under 19 Scratch race at the 2008 Australian National Track Championships. Despite this success on the track, in 2007 she shifted her focus to road cycling events. Over the next couple of years she would become a road racing specialist, with an emphasis on sprint challenges in bunch finishes to races.

In 2008 Hosking rode for Australia in the Women's road race at the UCI Juniors Road World Championships in South Africa where she placed 37th. In 2009, she relocated to Europe to ride competitively for the Moving Ladies club in the Netherlands, and by the end of the year she had been signed by top professional team . Shortly afterwards, she was the first  rider to win a 2010 event, with a victory at the Australian National Criterium Championships.

At the 2010 Commonwealth Games in Delhi, India, Hosking won the bronze medal in the Women's road race. It was revealed after the event that the Australian team of six riders was under orders to ride for a victory for Hosking in the  event in preference to veteran Australian cyclist Rochelle Gilmore, however in the final sprint for the line Gilmore came out with the gold medal ahead of English rider Lizzie Armitstead in second, leaving Hosking in third. At the end of the 2010 season Hosking was ranked 52nd in the world on the UCI elite women's rankings, and was younger than any of the riders ranked above her.

Professional career
She competed in the women's road race at the 2012 Olympic Games, but finished outside the time limit. She finished in 26th place in the road race at the 2014 Commonwealth Games.

Her 2015 season was shortened by a hand injury in July.

In 2018, she won the women's road race at the Commonwealth Games.

In October 2020, Hosking signed a two-year contract with the  team, from the 2021 season.

Major results

2007
 Oceania Junior Track Championships
2nd  Sprint
3rd  500m time trial
3rd  Scratch
 National Junior Track Championships
3rd Keirin
3rd Scratch
 4th Time trial, Oceania Junior Road Championships
2008
 National Junior Track Championships
1st  Scratch
3rd Points race
2009
 1st  Overall Tour of Chongming Island
1st  Sprints classification
1st Stages 1 & 3
 1st Women's International Cup
 1st GP Sankomij Veldhoven
 3rd Overall Bay Classic Series
 3rd Sparkassen Giro Bochum
 4th Grand Prix Stad Roeselare
 6th Omloop van Borsele
 8th Road race, Oceania Road Championships
2010
 1st  Under-23 race, National Criterium Championships
 1st Stage 1 (TTT) Merco Cycling Classic
 2nd Grand Prix Stad Roeselare
 3rd  Road race, Commonwealth Games
 3rd Overall Nature Valley Grand Prix
1st Sprints classification
1st Stages 2 & 4
 8th Sparkassen Giro
 8th Omloop van Borsele
2011
 1st Stage 3 Tour of Chongming Island
 1st Stage 2 (TTT) Trophée d'Or Féminin
 1st Stage 1 (TTT) Giro della Toscana Int. Femminile – Memorial Michela Fanini
 4th Overall Holland Ladies Tour
1st Young rider classification
 4th 7-Dorpenomloop Aalburg
 5th Liberty Classic
 6th Road race, UCI Road World Championships
 9th Sparkassen Giro
 10th Overall Ladies Tour of Qatar
2012
 1st Drentse 8 van Dwingeloo
 1st Halle-Buizingen
 1st Stage 5 La Route de France
 4th Tour of Chongming Island World Cup
 5th Overall Ladies Tour of Qatar
1st  Young rider classification
 7th Novilon Eurocup
 7th Grand Prix Stad Roeselare
 9th Classica Citta di Padova
2013
 1st Stage 5 Holland Ladies Tour
 2nd Overall Ladies Tour of Qatar
1st  Young rider classification
1st Stage 1
 2nd Overall Tour of Chongming Island
1st  Sprints classification
 3rd Ronde van Gelderland
 4th Ronde van Drenthe World Cup
 4th EPZ Omloop van Borsele
 7th Drentse 8 van Dwingeloo
 7th Sparkassen Giro Bochum
2014
 1st Omloop van Borsele
 1st Stage 2 Bay Classic Series
 3rd Overall Ladies Tour of Qatar
 6th Gooik–Geraardsbergen–Gooik
 8th Overall Belgium Tour
1st Stage 3
 9th Drentse 8 van Dwingeloo
2015
 1st Overall Bay Classic Series
1st Stage 1
 1st Marianne Vos Classic
 1st La Classique Morbihan
 2nd Overall Ladies Tour of Qatar
 2nd Novilon Eurocup Ronde van Drenthe
 2nd Grand Prix de Dottignies
 3rd Gent–Wevelgem
 4th Le Samyn des Dames
 5th Ronde van Drenthe World Cup
 9th Omloop van het Hageland
2016
 1st  Overall Tour of Chongming Island
1st  Points classification
1st  Mountains classification
1st Stage 2
 1st La Course by Le Tour de France
 1st Gran Premio Bruno Beghelli Internazionale Donne Elite
 1st Stage 3 Giro d'Italia Femminile
 1st Stage 3 La Route de France
 2nd Madrid Challenge by La Vuelta
 4th Cadel Evans Great Ocean Road Race
 6th Acht van Westerveld
 7th Road race, UCI Road World Championships
 7th Omloop Het Nieuwsblad
 9th Overall Ladies Tour of Qatar
1st Stage 4
2017
 1st Drentse Acht van Westerveld
 Women's Tour Down Under
1st  Sprints classification
1st Stage 3
 1st Stage 3 The Women's Tour
 2nd Omloop van het Hageland
 2nd Grand Prix de Dottignies
 3rd Overall Tour of Chongming Island
1st  Points classification
 6th Overall Ladies Tour of Norway
1st Stage 2
 6th Road race, Crescent Vårgårda
 7th Madrid Challenge by La Vuelta
 8th Cadel Evans Great Ocean Road Race
 10th Ronde van Drenthe
2018
 1st  Road race, Commonwealth Games
 1st Cadel Evans Great Ocean Road Race
 1st Stage 4 Women's Tour Down Under
 2nd Omloop van het Hageland
 2nd Three Days of Bruges–De Panne
 3rd Overall Women's Herald Sun Tour
1st  Points classification
 3rd Drentse Acht van Westerveld
 3rd Ronde van Drenthe
 4th Omloop Het Nieuwsblad
 4th RideLondon Classique
 9th Overall Tour of Chongming Island
2019
 1st Tour of Guangxi Women's WorldTour
 1st Stage 4 Women's Tour Down Under
 Women's Herald Sun Tour
1st  Points classification
1st Stage 1
 1st Stage 2 Madrid Challenge by la Vuelta
 1st Stage 2 Bay Classic Series
 4th Postnord UCI WWT Vårgårda West Sweden
 10th Overall Giro della Toscana Int. Femminile – Memorial Michela Fanini
1st Stage 1
 10th Overall Giro delle Marche in Rosa
 10th Drentse Acht van Westerveld
2020
 National Road Championships
1st  Criterium
5th Road race
 1st Overall Bay Classic Series
1st Stages 2 & 3
 1st Grand Prix International d'Isbergues
 1st Stage 7 Tour Cycliste Féminin International de l'Ardèche
 5th Overall Women's Tour Down Under
1st Stage 1
 5th Race Torquay
 6th Cadel Evans Great Ocean Road Race
 8th Omloop Het Nieuwsblad
2021
 1st Stage 4 Ladies Tour of Norway
 1st Stage 3 Tour Cycliste Féminin International de l'Ardèche
 3rd Le Samyn
 4th Grand Prix International d'Isbergues
 4th Drentse Acht van Westerveld
 7th Classic Brugge–De Panne
2022
 6th Scheldeprijs
 2nd Bloeizone Fryslân Tour

References

External links

 
 
 
 
 
 
 
 
  (2010)
  (2014)
 
 
 
 

1990 births
Living people
Australian female cyclists
Olympic cyclists of Australia
Cyclists at the 2012 Summer Olympics
Commonwealth Games medallists in cycling
Commonwealth Games gold medallists for Australia
Commonwealth Games bronze medallists for Australia
Cyclists at the 2010 Commonwealth Games
Cyclists at the 2014 Commonwealth Games
Cyclists at the 2018 Commonwealth Games
ACT Academy of Sport alumni
People from Bendigo
Sportswomen from Victoria (Australia)
Cyclists from Victoria (Australia)
20th-century Australian women
21st-century Australian women
Medallists at the 2010 Commonwealth Games
Medallists at the 2018 Commonwealth Games